"Te Amo" is a song by Colombian band Piso 21 and Argentine rapper Paulo Londra, from their second studio album Ubuntu (2018). It was released on 15 March 2018 by the Mexican division of the Warner Music Group as the album's sixth single. The song was written by its performers, and producer OvyOnTheDrums. The song was a commercial success in Latin America, where it peaked in the top ten of various Monitor Latino charts.

Music video
The music video for "Te Amo" premiered on 15 March 2018 on Piso 21's YouTube account. Filmed in Colombia, it was directed by Paloma Valencia of 36 Grados and has been viewed over 560 million times.

Track listing

Charts

Weekly charts

Year-end charts

Certifications

References

2018 songs
2018 singles
Piso 21 songs
Paulo Londra songs
Spanish-language songs
Warner Music Mexico singles